Walk Down the Road is the first live album by independent Filipino singer-songwriter Cynthia Alexander released in 2009. It features her longtime Joey Ayala at ang Bagong Lumad colleague Mlou Matute on piano, darbouka, backing vocals and kulintang; along with jazz bassist Simon Tan, young drummer Rickson Ruiz, and the Indian musician, Charanjit Wasu, on tabla and dhol.

Track listing

References 
1.*Pelicola.tv - Internet Television

External links
MySpace page

2009 live albums